Better Tomorrow is a 2016 Burmese drama television series. It aired on MRTV-4, from October 12 to November 15, 2016, on Mondays to Fridays at 19:15 for 25 episodes.

Cast
Aung Min Khant as Mr. Happy, Mg Wann Thar
Aung Yay Chan as N Mai Kha, Mg Wann Thar
Nat Khat as Eaint Muu Naing, Mg Wann Thar
Chue Lay as Ma Net Phyan
Yan Aung as Paing Thitsar, Min Kan Si
Nay Myo Aung as Zaw Loon
May Thinzar Oo as Shwe Mya Nandar
Ju Jue Kay as Sue Hnin Si

References

External links

Burmese television series
MRTV (TV network) original programming